Great Northern Freight Warehouse is a red brick warehouse in Fargo, North Dakota that was listed on the National Register of Historic Places in 1990.

It was built in 1902 and later expanded, in Chicago and/or Commercial Style architecture style.

It's significant for its history and for its architecture.

The eastern end is a two-story  section built in 1923, probably replacing an office section of the original 1902 building, which functions as a headhouse.

References

Railway freight houses on the National Register of Historic Places
Commercial buildings on the National Register of Historic Places in North Dakota
Buildings and structures in Fargo, North Dakota
Chicago school architecture in the United States
Commercial Style architecture in the United States
Commercial buildings completed in 1902
Great Northern Railway (U.S.)
National Register of Historic Places in Cass County, North Dakota
Railway buildings and structures on the National Register of Historic Places in North Dakota
Transportation in Cass County, North Dakota
1902 establishments in North Dakota